Miralay or Mîr-i alay (Gendarmerie: Alaybeyi) was a military rank of the Ottoman Army and Navy. The modern Turkish equivalent is Albay, meaning Colonel. Miralay is a compound word composed of Mir (commander) and Alay (regiment). 

Miralay was a Senior Colonel rank in the Ottoman Army and the pre-1934 Turkish Army (similar to the rank Brigadier in the British ranking system.) It was junior to the rank Mirliva (Brigadier General) and senior to the rank Kaymakam (regular Colonel). The collar mark (later shoulder mark) and cap of a Miralay had two stripes and three stars during the early years of the Turkish Republic. 

The Ottoman Army and pre-1934 Turkish Army had three general ranks (similar to the British ranking system), while the current Turkish Army has four general ranks (similar to the American ranking system), with the inclusion of General (Orgeneral) as the fourth introduced in 1934.

The rank of Miralay was abolished with Act No. 2590 of 26 November 1934 on the Abolition of Titles and Appellations such as Efendi, Bey or Pasha.

Sources

See also 
Comparative military ranks of World War I

Military ranks of the Ottoman Empire
Turkish words and phrases